Ingrow (West) railway station is a single-platform station serving the suburb of Ingrow in Keighley, West Yorkshire, England. It is served by the preserved Keighley and Worth Valley Railway.

History 

Although work began in 1864, the Worth Valley was delayed in opening until 1867 due to some issues, not least a Methodist chapel at Ingrow, which stood right underneath where the tunnel immediately south of the station would go. This involved spending over £150,000 in resiting the chapel. The station opened in April 1867, along with the rest of the line, but was closed in January 1962 to passengers and in June 1962 to goods. After the station's closure, the existing station building was vandalised and later demolished, so, when re-opened in 1968, it was used as an unstaffed request stop. The building at Foulridge was then demolished and rebuilt at Ingrow, opening in 1989.

On its opening, the K&WVR had six out-and-back services between Keighley and Oxenhope, which had risen to eight workings per day in the 1880s. By 1906, the branch and Ingrow were being served by sixteen services daily, which in 1946, two years before nationalisation, had been reduced to twelve.

Stationmasters

G. Johnson until 1874
J. Urch 1874 – 1883 
H. Ellis 1883 – 1887
Joseph Hartley 1887 – 1891
Samuel Burnley 1891 – c. 1914
A Gledhill from 1942 (formerly station master at Hope, also station master at Ingrow East)

Incidents
The station lies at the end of a relatively straight downhill from Oakworth, some  distant, and so was fitted with catch points. On 27 September 1875, some goods wagons became detached from their engine and rolled down the gradient. The signaller at Ingrow was supposed to have left the catch points set for derailing in the station there, but on hearing a whistle, he changed the points expecting the full goods train. The wagons ran into Keighley station where they crashed into a passenger train.

The station today 

The station (off South Street, Ingrow) is the first scheduled stop on the line from Keighley railway station. The Vintage Carriages Trust, which supplies historical carriages for film and TV programmes, has its Museum of Rail Travel which opened in 1990 next to the station. The station is home to the Bahamas Locomotive Society and its collection of locomotives. The society runs the Ingrow Loco Museum in the former goods shed, which has been extended to create workshop space for the overhaul of its collection of locomotives. The goods shed is an original feature of the 1867 station. The gates at the entrance to Ingrow West are from the former Midland Goods Yard in Keighley, which is now Sainsbury's.

Ingrow had a second station, Ingrow (East), which served the Great Northern Railway's Queensbury Lines to Bradford and Halifax.

References

Sources

External links 

 Information about Ingrow (West) station from K&WVR
 Ingrow Museum of Rail Travel - Vintage Carriages Trust
 Ingrow Loco Museum – Bahamas Locomotive Society

Heritage railway stations in Bradford
Former Midland Railway stations
Railway stations in Great Britain opened in 1867
Railway stations in Great Britain closed in 1962
Railway stations in Great Britain opened in 1968
Buildings and structures in Keighley
Keighley and Worth Valley Railway